Kenneth Chung Kun Wah (born 11 July 1985), better known by his stage name Kunhua, is a Singaporean radio personality and actor. He works as a radio disk jockey for Singapore-based Chinese music station YES 933.

Background
Chung had previously worked part-time for YES 933 in as early as 2005. He later attended the National Chengchi University in Taipei, Taiwan, where he studied arts and radio.

Graduating in 2010, he joined YES 933 as a professional disk jockey that year. He is the host of his own radio show, Moo...ve It On, which is targeted at school-going children.

Filmography

Movie / Theater
2011: Resonance 回音
2014: Like Me.I Like 守机碍情

Television Series

Compilation album

Awards and nominations

References

1985 births
Living people
Singaporean DJs
Singaporean people of Hakka descent